Sabcomeline (Memric; SB-202,026) is a selective M1 receptor partial agonist that was under development for the treatment of Alzheimer's disease. It made it to phase III clinical trials before being discontinued due to poor results.

See also 
 Alvameline
 Milameline
 Tazomeline
 Xanomeline

References 

Muscarinic agonists
Nitriles
Oximes
Quinuclidines
Experimental drugs